Elmbach is a river of Hesse, Germany. It flows into the Kinzig in Schlüchtern.

Tributaries
Weichersbach - 1.8 km (right)
Eckelsbach - 2.4 km (right)
Schwarzbach - 11.5 km (left)
(Bach aus der) Schöchterner Aue (right)

See also
List of rivers of Hesse

References

Rivers of Hesse
Rivers of Germany